Harriet Ruth Brisbane Tracy (December 6, 1834 – May 30, 1918) was a prolific American inventor. Tracy is credited with receiving patents for at least 27 inventions between 1868 and 1915, including six for elevators and seventeen for sewing machines. Ten of the those patents came during a very productive period from 1890-1893. Tracy displayed several of her inventions at the World's Columbian Exposition in 1893. According to her obituary she was also "gifted as a writer of verse and prose", contributing frequently to "magazines and periodicals."

Early life 
Born Harriet Ruth Brisbane in Charleston, South Carolina to William Brisbane (1809-1860) and Julia Hall Lowndes (1811-1847). The noted abolitionist William Henry Brisbane (1806-1878) was her first cousin once removed.

Inventions 
Tracy's first patent, was for a crib attachment for bedsteads in 1868. In addition to sewing machine and elevator patents, she also received a patent for a cooking stove, and a fire escape, which she described in her 1883 patent application as a "simple, cheap, durable, compact, and efficient fire-escape ladder which may be folded into a small compass."

Tracy's most well-known invention was an elevator patent which she received in 1892 and was subsequently called the "Tracy Gravity Safety Elevator." It had a special safety mechanism that slowed down the elevator's decent in case of a power outage. It was installed and used in the Woman's Building at the World's Columbian Exposition in Chicago to take visitors up and down to the dining facilities on the rooftop.  Her gravity elevator was commercialized in New York City.

In addition to her elevator at the exposition, Tracy also displayed several of her sewing machine inventions in the Liberal Arts Building. Her most popular was the "Tracy Lock-Stitch and Chain-Stitch Sewing Machine" which held her newly invented rotary shuttle mechanism and could hold up to 1,000 yards of thread.

Personal life 

In 1860 she married Cadwallader Colden Tracy (1830-1921), a baseball player who had been a member the New York Knickerbockers in 1854. From about 1860-1890 she lived on Staten Island, New York in the village of New Brighton. Tracy and her husband had four daughters. They moved to Paris, France, around 1890 and then to London, England.

Death and legacy 
She died in 1918 in Brentford.

Collections 
Patent Model - Improved Crib-Attachment for Bedsteads, February 25, 1868, Hagley Museum and Library

References

Further reading

19th-century American inventors
20th-century American inventors
People from Charleston, South Carolina
1834 births
1918 deaths
Women inventors
World's Columbian Exposition
Inventors from South Carolina